The Ferrari 512S Modulo is a concept sports car designed by Paolo Martin of the Italian carrozzeria Pininfarina, unveiled at the  1970 Geneva Motor Show.

Description
The Modulo has an extremely low and wedge-shaped body, with a canopy-style glass roof that slides forward to permit entry to the cabin of the car. All four wheels are partly covered.

History
The Modulo originally started out as a Ferrari 512S (chassis and engine #27) and was converted to 612 Can Am spec. After testing, the engine and transmission were removed and the chassis was stripped down and given to Pininfarina to build a show car. The show car debuted at the 1970 Geneva Motor Show and was originally painted black, but was later repainted in the white. The Modulo was well received by critics and has won 22 awards for its design.

In 2014, Pininfarina sold the Modulo to American entrepreneur and automotive aficionado James Glickenhaus who is restoring it to full operating condition.

See also
Canopy door

References

External links 

 Ferrari Modulo at Pininfarina's web site (Italian)
 Ferrari Modulo at Paolo Martin's website
 Ferrari 512 S Modulo at UltimateCarPage.com

Modulo
Pininfarina